Esquías is a municipality in the Honduran department of Comayagua.

Municipalities of the Comayagua Department